"One Step Forward" is a song written by Chris Hillman and Bill Wildes, and recorded by American country music group The Desert Rose Band. It was released in October 1987, as the third single from the album The Desert Rose Band. The song reached #2 on the Billboard Hot Country Singles & Tracks chart, behind "Tennessee Flat Top Box" by Rosanne Cash. 

This song can also be heard on the video game Grand Theft Auto: San Andreas, on the fictional radio station, K-Rose.

Charts

Weekly charts

Year-end charts

References

1987 singles
The Desert Rose Band songs
Songs written by Chris Hillman
Song recordings produced by Paul Worley
MCA Records singles
Curb Records singles
1987 songs